Savvato (Saturday) is an album by modern Laika and pop Greek singer Giorgos Mazonakis. It was released in 2003 by Heaven Music and went Platinum in Greece. The album is written (lyrics & music) entirely by Phoebus who also produced the record. It is the second collaboration of Giorgos Mazonakis with Phoebus after the 2 songs on album "Koita me+beat" (2002).

Track listing
 "To Gucci forema" - 5:19
 "Apopse tha s'oneirefto" - 4:40
 "Foveri" - 3:00
 "Nikotini" - 3:48
 "An den mporeis" - 3:51
 "Pou na pao" - 5:21
 "Efiges" - 4:19
 "Prospieise" - 3:04
 "Tesseris" - 4:12
 "Savvato" - 3:50
 "San imouna paidi" - 4:37
 "Etsi imoun" - 3:50
 "Paliozoi" - 3:46
 "Outro (Foveros)" - 2:51

All the lyrics and music: Phoebus

References

2003 albums
Giorgos Mazonakis albums
Heaven Music albums
Albums produced by Phoebus (songwriter)